2nd Earl of Clarendon may refer to:
Henry Hyde, 2nd Earl of Clarendon (1638–1709)
Thomas Villiers, 2nd Earl of Clarendon (1753–1824)